The People's Republic of China competed at the 2018 Asian Games in Jakarta and Palembang, Indonesia, from 18 August to 2 September 2018. China won 289 medals (132 gold, 92 silver and 65 bronze), leading the medal count for the tenth time in Asian Games history.

With Hangzhou hosting the 2022 Asian Games, a Chinese segment was performed at the closing ceremony.

Medalists

The following China competitors won medals at the Games.

Demonstration events

Competitors
The following is the list of number of competitors participating in the Games. Note that reserves in fencing, field hockey, football, and handball are counted as athletes:

Demonstration events

Archery

Recurve

Artistic swimming

Athletics

Badminton

Men

Women

Mixed

Baseball

China entered their team at the Games, and started to compete in the round 2 group A.

Roster
The following is the China roster for the men's baseball tournament of the 2018 Asian Games.

Round 2 – Group A

Super round

Bronze medal match

Basketball

Summary

5x5 basketball

Men's tournament

Roster
China's roster for the men's basketball tournament of the 2018 Asian Games.

Group D

Quarter-final

Semi-final

Gold medal game

Women's tournament

Roster
The following is the China roster for the women's basketball tournament of the 2018 Asian Games.

Group Y

Quarter-final

Semi-final

Gold medal game

3x3 basketball

Men's tournament

Roster
The following is the China roster in the men's 3x3 basketball tournament of the 2018 Asian Games.
Chen Gong
Xiao Hailing
Huang Wenwei
Zeng Bingqiang

Pool A

Quarter-final

Semifinal

Gold medal game

Women's tournament

Roster
The following is the China roster in the women's 3x3 basketball tournament of the 2018 Asian Games.
Li Yingyun
Jiang Jiayin
Dilana Dilixiati
Zhang Zhiting

Pool A

Quarter-final

Semifinal

Gold medal game

Bowling

Boxing 

Men

Women

Canoeing

Slalom

Sprint

Qualification legend: QF=Final; QS=Semifinal

Traditional boat race 

Men

Women

Contract bridge 

Men

Women

Mixed

Cycling

BMX

Mountain biking

Road

Track

Sprint

Team sprint

 Riders who entered the competition but did not participating in any phase of the team event.
Qualification legend: FA=Gold medal final; FB=Bronze medal final

Pursuit

 Riders who participated in the heats only and received medals.
 Riders who entered the competition but did not participating in any phase of the team event.
Qualification legend: FA=Gold medal final; FB=Bronze medal final

Keirin

Qualification legend: FA=Gold medal final; FB=Bronze medal final

Omnium

Madison

Diving 

Men

Women

Equestrian 

Dressage

Eventing

Esports (demonstration) 

Arena of Valor and Clash Royale

League of Legends

Fencing 

Individual

Team

Field hockey

China participated in the field hockey event with their women's team that was entered in the pool A. The team advance to the semifinal stage, but was defeated by Indian team with the score 0–1. In the bronze medal match, the team dominate the game, and grabbed the bronze medal after beating South Korea with the score 2–1. Gu Bingfeng was awarded as the top scorer in the women's team event after amassed 13 goals.

Summary

Women's tournament 

Roster

Pool A

Semifinal

Bronze medal game

Football

Summary

Men's tournament

Team roster

Group stage

Round of 16

Women's tournament

Team roster

Group stage

Quarterfinal

Semi-final

Gold medal match

Golf 

Men

Women

Gymnastics

Handball

China joined in group A at the women's team event.

Summary

Women's tournament

Roster

Lin Yanqun
Zhang Haixia
Li Xiaoqing
Wu Yin
Wu Nana
Yu Yuanyuan
Wang Haiye
Si Wen
Liu Xiaomei
Sha Zhengwen
Yang Jiao
Zhao Jiaqin
Yang Yurou
Li Yao
Qiao Ru
Lan Xiaoling

 Group A

 Semifinal

 Gold medal game

Jet ski

Ju-jitsu 

China entered the ju-jitsu competition with 2 athletes (1 men's and 1 women's), but the athletes were disqualified.

Men

Women

Judo 

Men

Women

Mixed

Karate

China entered the karate competition with 8 athletes (4 men's and 4 women's).

Modern pentathlon 

Chinese Modern Pentathlon Association announced four pentathletes (2 men's and 2 women's) who competed at the Games.

Paragliding 

Men

Women

Roller sports

Skateboarding

Speed skating

Rowing 

Men

Women

Rugby sevens 

China rugby sevens men's and women's team drawn in group A respectively. China women's team was a champion in the last edition in 2014 Incheon.

Men's tournament 

Squad
The following is the China squad in the men's rugby sevens tournament of the 2018 Asian Games.

Head coach: Lu Xiaohui

Chen Yongqiang
Feng Wenru
Hu Zhenye
Jiang Liwei
Li Haitao
Liu Junkui
Liu Luda
Ma Chong
Qi Changyuan
Shan Changshun
Wang Jianhua
Zhang Chao

Group A

Quarterfinal

Classification semifinal (5–8)

Fifth place game

Women's tournament 

Squad
The following is the China squad in the women's rugby sevens tournament of the 2018 Asian Games.

Head coach:  Chad Brenan Shepherd

Chen Keyi
Chen Ming
Gao Yueying
Hu Yu
Liu Xiaoqian
Lu Yuanyuan
Sun Caihong
Wang Wanyu
Yan Meiling
Yang Min
Yu Liping
Yu Xiaoming

Group A

Quarterfinal

Semifinal

Gold medal game

Sailing

Men

Women

Mixed

Sepak takraw 

Men

Shooting 

Men

Women

Mixed team

Soft tennis

Softball 

China women's national softball team qualified for the Asian Games by finishing fourth in the 2017 Asian Women's Softball Championship.

Summary

Roster

Chai Yinan
Chen Jia
Li Huan
Li Qi
Liu Lili
Liu Yining
Lu Ying
Ren Min
Wang Bei
Wang Lan
Wang Mengyan
Wang Xiaoqing
Xi Kailin
Xu Jia
Xu Qianwen
Zhang Yan
Zhao Xinxing

Preliminary round
The top four teams will advance to the Final round.

Semifinal

Bronze medal match

Sport climbing 

Speed

Speed relay

Combined

Squash 

Singles

Team

Swimming

Men

 Swimmers who participated in the heats only and received medals.

Women

 Swimmers who participated in the heats only and received medals.
 Swimmers who participated in the heats.

Mixed

 Swimmers who participated in the heats only and received medals.

Table tennis

Individual

Team

Taekwondo

Poomsae

Kyorugi

Tennis 

Men

Women

Mixed

Triathlon 

Individual

Mixed relay

Volleyball

Beach volleyball

Indoor volleyball

Men's tournament

Team roster
The following is the Chinese roster in the men's volleyball tournament of the 2018 Asian Games.

Head coach: Shen Qiong

Pool E

Quarterfinal

7th–10th semifinals

9th place game

Women's tournament

Team roster
The following is the Chinese roster in the women's volleyball tournament of the 2018 Asian Games.

Head coach: Lang Ping

Pool B

Quarterfinal

Semifinal

Gold medal game

Water polo 

Summary

Men's tournament

Team roster
Head coach:  Petar Porobić

Wu Honghui (GK) (C)
Liu Xiao (D)
Peng Jiahao (−)
Chu Chenghao (CF)
Sha Shi (CB)
Xie Zekai (D)
Chen Zhongxian (D)
Chen Rui (CB)
Chen Yimin (D)
Chen Jinghao (D)
Zhang Chufeng (D)
Zhu Gelin (D)
Liang Zhiwei (GK)

Group B

Quarter-final

Semifinal

Bronze medal game

Women's tournament

Team roster
Head coach: Gong Dali

Peng Lin (GK)
Zhai Ying (D)
Mei Xiaohan (CB) (C)
Xiong Dunhan (CF)
Niu Guannan (D)
Guo Ning (D)
Nong Sanfeng (CB)
Zhang Cong (D)
Wang Huan (CB)
Zhang Danyi (D)
Chen Xiao (CF)
Zhang Jing (D)
Shen Yineng (GK)

Round robin

Weightlifting 

China has prepared 14 weightlifters to compete at the Games, but the athletes not allowed to compete due to the International Weightlifting Federation’s (IWF) ban on the country.

Wrestling 

China took 6 medals (2 gold, 1 silver, and 3 bronze) at the competition. The gold medals won by Zhou Feng who was a gold medalist in the freestyle −75 kg 2014 Asian Games, and the other one won by Zhou Qian.

Men's freestyle

Men's Greco-Roman

Women's freestyle

Wushu 

Taolu

Sanda

Key: * TV – Technical victory.

See also
 China at the 2018 Asian Para Games

References

Nations at the 2018 Asian Games
2018
Asian Games